Gravetemple is the name given to the line-up of Attila Csihar, Stephen O'Malley and Oren Ambarchi. The trio formed in the summer of 2006 when Sunn O))) was invited to play in Israel, while Israel was engaged in the 2006 Lebanon War, and some of its members refused to travel there. In Summer 2008, the trio reformed together with Australian drummer Matt "Skitz" Sanders for a short European tour. This band is not to be confused with the Burial Chamber Trio, which consists of a similar line-up but with Greg Anderson instead of Stephen O'Malley. Gravetemple released The Holy Down in 2007 through Southern Lord Records.

Discography

Studio albums
The Holy Down (CD 2007) - limited to 3000 copies
Impassable Fears (2017)

Demos
Ambient/Ruin (demo CDR 2008)
"Le Vampire de Paris" (CD 2009) Limited to 350 copies

External links
 Grave Temple live footage pt. 1
 Grave Temple live footage pt. 2

Doom metal musical groups
Musical groups established in 2006